Mikhail Alekseyevich Moiseyev (22 January 1939 – 18 December 2022) was a Soviet-Russian military officer and politician. A member of the Communist Party, he served as Chief of the General Staff of the Soviet Armed Forces from 1988 to 1991.

Moiseyev died on 18 December 2022, at the age of 83.

References

1939 births
2022 deaths
People from Amur Oblast
Central Committee of the Communist Party of the Soviet Union members
Frunze Military Academy alumni
Sixth convocation members of the State Duma (Russian Federation)
Military Academy of the General Staff of the Armed Forces of the Soviet Union alumni
Recipients of the Medal "For Distinction in Guarding the State Border of the USSR"
Recipients of the Medal of Zhukov
Recipients of the Order "For Service to the Homeland in the Armed Forces of the USSR", 2nd class
Recipients of the Order "For Service to the Homeland in the Armed Forces of the USSR", 3rd class
Recipients of the Order of Honour (Russia)
Recipients of the Order of Military Merit (Russia)
Recipients of the Order of the Red Banner
Army generals (Soviet Union)